Vivan Bhatena (born 28 October 1978) is an Indian model and actor who appears predominantly in Hindi films. His notable films include Dangal (2016), Judwaa 2 (2017) and Raja the Great (2017). Vivan won Mister India World title in 2001. In 2016, he was a contestant on Fear Factor: Khatron Ke Khiladi 7.

Background
Bhatena moved from modelling to acting with his first television role as Tulsi Virani's son-in-law Abhishek in Kyunki Saas Bhi Kabhi Bahu Thi. He later appeared in Maayka, Kumkum - Ek Pyara Sa Bandhan and Pyaar Ka Bandhan. Bhatena, the 2001 "Mr. India" title holder, was also seen on the stage in Sandiip Sikcand's Champagne On The House.  He was also seen in Falguni Pathak's video Maine Payal Hain Chankaayi.

Television

Filmography

References

External links

 

1978 births
Living people
21st-century Indian male actors
Indian male models
Indian male film actors
Indian male television actors
Male actors from Mumbai
Fear Factor: Khatron Ke Khiladi participants